Jelmoli is a department store in Zürich, Switzerland. It is one of the oldest and best known in the world. It introduced features such as no-haggle pricing and a mail order catalog. It is located along the famous Bahnhofstrasse in Zürich.

History 
The original store was founded in 1833 by Johann Peter Jelmoli Ciolina as a fashion shop. The original property was in the Schipfe, Zürich's oldest continually inhabited district, on the river Limmat.

The store opened with the new concept of fixed prices where prices were posted and no price negotiation was expected.

Thanks to immediate success, expansion began in earnest in the mid-1880s by Jelmoli's descendants. The company founded in 1896 became a limited company (SA Jelmoli department stores in 1899) to raise capital for the construction of a new department store. The shipping business began in 1897 with the first mail order catalog as a retail store with shipping.

The new store was designed as a glass palace after Parisian department stores and became the new headquarters of Jelmoli. The building was completed in 1898 at the site of the former silk farms with 72 employees.

Gradually, and with major expansions in 1931–1938, 1947, and 1958–1961, grew into a glass palace with a closed courtyard. Due to the construction history, the exterior style differs significantly on two faces. Razing of adjacent properties (stone mill, vehicle fuel station) led to construction of the store's car park, and created new commercial space where, among other businesses, the Hiltl, the oldest vegetarian restaurant in Switzerland now exists.

In 1940, under pressure from anti-semitism in Switzerland, the Jewish board members of Jelmoli quit and emigrated to the United States.

In 1952, management was reorganized to begin building a chain of stores, which opened the first store in 1954 in Oerlikon, followed by at least 50 more Jelmoli department stores throughout Switzerland. In 1963, Romandie Jelmoli expanded through the acquisition of stores in Lausanne and Au Grand Passage Geneva. In 1968, a second store in Lausanne (Sébeillon) was completed.

The diversification of the department store group began in 1972 with the construction of Jelmoli Travel, the Molino restaurant chain, and Terlinden-Jelmoli dry cleaners. Jelmoli Group reached its zenith in 1988 at 231 locations, 5200 employees and a gross revenue of 1471 million Swiss Francs.

In the 1990s, sales and profits were steadily declining in all department stores industry wide, part of a Swiss consumer spending change. As a result, in 1995–1996, Jelmoli pulled back significantly from the department store business, closing all stores except the glass palace in Zürich. Thus, the distribution centers were unnecessary, and the majority of the Jelmoli shipping was sold. Since 1997, Jelmoli brands itself as a shop-within-a-shop gallery under the slogan "The House of Brands".

References

External links

 

Organisations based in Zürich
Department stores of Switzerland
Buildings and structures in Zürich
Tourist attractions in Zürich